The 2019 KPIT MSLTA Challenger was a professional tennis tournament played on hard courts. It was the sixth edition of the tournament which was part of the 2019 ATP Challenger Tour. It took place in Pune, India from 11 to 17 November 2019.

Singles main-draw entrants

Seeds

 1 Rankings are as of 4 November 2019.

Other entrants
The following players received wildcards into the singles main draw:
  Anvit Bendre
  Aryan Goveas
  Dhruva Mulye
  Lakshit Sood
  Dhruv Sunish

The following player received entry into the singles main draw as an alternate:
  Vinayak Sharma Kaza

The following players received entry from the qualifying draw:
  Tejas Chaukulkar
  Dalwinder Singh

Champions

Singles

  James Duckworth def.  Jay Clarke 4–6, 6–4, 6–4.

Doubles

  Purav Raja /  Ramkumar Ramanathan def.  Arjun Kadhe /  Saketh Myneni 7–6(7–3), 6–3.

References

2019 ATP Challenger Tour
2019
2019 in Indian tennis
November 2019 sports events in India